God Is My Bike is the debut album by Maïa Vidal, released 28 October 2011 in Europe on the Crammed Discs label. The album was made available in the United States iTunes Store on 30 October 2012.

Track listing 
Source: iTunes Store UK

Critical reception 

The album has been praised by the critics.  Denis Zorgniotti writing for France's Benzine Magazine opened his review by declaring that it is impossible to resist the charm which emanates from God Is My Bike, and that Maïa Vidal projects a unique melodic freshness, and that she is assured of a great musical career. Eelco Schilder writing for the German webzine FolkWorld said: "Vidal shows with this CD to be a fantastic singer, composer and musician. She has this bit airy, folk voice and fits with her compositions that are full of small sounds and nice alternative arrangements, in the more commercial orientated new-folk movement."

References 

2011 albums
Crammed Discs albums